Emanuele Filiberto Duca d'Aosta was an Italian light cruiser of the fourth group of the  , that served in the Regia Marina during World War II. She survived the war, but was ceded as war reparation to the Soviet Navy in 1949. She was finally renamed Kerch and served in the Black Sea Fleet until the 1960s.

Design
Duca d'Aosta was the namesake of the fourth subclass of Condottieri light cruisers. The design of the Duca d'Aostas  derived from the preceding Montecuccoli class, with a slight increase in size and a significant increase in armour. The machinery was also re-arranged.

Duca d'Aosta was built by OTO, Livorno and was named after Emanuele Filiberto, 2nd Duke of Aosta, an Italian Field Marshal of World War I.

Career
The ship joined the 7th Cruiser Division and in 1938 departed on a circumnavigation with her sister-ship, . The deteriorating world political situation caused this to be cut short after visits to the Caribbean and South America, and the ships returned La Spezia in March 1939.

World War II
At the Italian entry into the war, d'Aosta was part of the 2nd Cruiser Squadron and participated in the Battle of Punta Stilo between 6–10 July. In addition, she protected North Africa convoys, took part in a fleet sortie against British cruisers and bombarded Corfu on 18 December.

During 1941, d'Aosta served mostly with the 8th Cruiser Division, laying minefields off North Africa and protecting convoys. One of the convoy duties, in December, led to the First Battle of Sirte, in which d'Aosta took part.

Her duties in 1942 were much as before, but with aggressive actions against Allied convoys, including the Operations Harpoon and Vigorous, in June, to resupply the British controlled island of Malta. She sailed in August to intercept the critical Pedestal convoy, but, being without air cover, this sortie was abandoned.

In 1943, d'Aosta was inactive due to fuel shortages for most of the remainder of the year, but in August, she attempted, unsuccessfully, a bombardment of Allied positions around Palermo.

d'Aosta was a "lucky ship" in that she never was damaged in any of the naval actions in which she participated nor was she ever damaged by air attack or submarine attack.

Allied service
While in front of South America, the sailors broke up in mutiny, because of too long time (six months) without a single port call. There were seven patrols between November 1943 and February 1944; she returned to Italy in April and, thereafter, was used only for transport.

Postwar
d'Aosta was transferred to the Soviet Union on 2 March 1949 and served as Kerch in the Black Sea Fleet. The cruiser became a training ship in February 1956. Kerch was stricken on 20 February 1959 and scrapped.

Citations

References

External links
 Emanuele Filiberto Duca d'Aosta Marina Militare website 

Duca d'Aosta-class cruisers
Ships built in Livorno
1934 ships
World War II cruisers of Italy
Italy–Soviet Union relations
Duca d'Aosta-class cruisers of the Soviet Navy